Belinda Woolcock (born 24 January 1995) is an Australian tennis player. She has a career-high singles ranking of 290 by the Women's Tennis Association (WTA), achieved on 18 November 2019, and a career-high WTA doubles ranking of 207, reached on 22 February 2021.

Woolcock made her Grand Slam debut at the 2016 Australian Open, competing in the main draw of the doubles tournament with Ellen Perez; however, they lost in the first round to Jessica Moore and Storm Sanders. In 2017, Belinda and Astra Sharma won the Australia Open Wildcard Playoff to win a main-draw wildcard for the 2018 Australian Open women's doubles event.

She attended the University of Florida where she graduated in 2017 with a bachelor's degree of Science in Sport Management. In her final year for the Florida Gators, her team won the NCAA National Championship whilst being honoured the Most Valuable Player of the tournament. Due to this great effort in her final year with the Florida Gators, Belinda was recognised for her achievements and named the 2017 Honda Sports Award winner for Women's Tennis, signifying “the best of the best in collegiate athletics”.

ITF Circuit finals

Singles: 3 (1 title, 2 runner–ups)

Doubles: 10 (6 titles, 4 runner–ups)

References

External links
 
 
 
 Belinda Woolcock at the Florida Gators

1995 births
Living people
Australian female tennis players
Tennis players from Melbourne
Florida Gators women's tennis players
LGBT tennis players
Australian LGBT sportspeople
21st-century Australian LGBT people